Gray Court-Owings School is a historic school building located at Gray Court, Laurens County, South Carolina. The building consists of a two-story central brick building constructed in 1914, with a flanking one-story brick-veneered high school building and a one-story brick-veneered auditorium, both built in 1928. The flanking buildings are designed in the Colonial Revival style with Tuscan order porticos. A two-story Tuscan order portico was added to the entrance of the 1914 building in 1928. A contributing one-story frame potato house was built in the 1930s to help local farmers preserve their crops.

It was added to the National Register of Historic Places in 2004.

Gray Court-Owings is the home of the Tigers who participate in both junior high (7th and 8th grade) football and basketball in the Laurens District 55 school district.

References 

School buildings on the National Register of Historic Places in South Carolina
School buildings completed in 1928
Colonial Revival architecture in South Carolina
Buildings and structures in Laurens County, South Carolina
National Register of Historic Places in Laurens County, South Carolina
1928 establishments in South Carolina